Edward La Rue Hamilton (December 9, 1857 – November 2, 1923) was a politician from the U.S. state of Michigan.

Hamilton was born in Niles Township, Michigan, where he attended grade school and graduated from the Niles High School in 1876. He studied law, was admitted to the bar in 1884, and commenced practice in Niles, Michigan.

Hamilton was elected as a Republican from Michigan's 4th congressional district to the 55th United States Congress and subsequently re-elected to the eleven succeeding Congresses, serving from March 4, 1897 to March 3, 1921. He was chairman of the Committee on Territories in the 58th through 61st Congresses. He was not a candidate for renomination in 1920.

He engaged in the practice of law until his death in St. Joseph, Michigan in 1923. He was interred in Silverbrook Cemetery in Niles, Michigan.

References

The Political Graveyard

External links
 

1857 births
1923 deaths
Republican Party members of the United States House of Representatives from Michigan